Willie Mae's Scotch House is a restaurant in New Orleans, Louisiana.  In 2022, it was announced they would be opening a location in Los Angeles.

History

Originally opened in 1957 in the Tremé neighborhood by Willie Mae Seaton operating as a bar, beauty shop and restaurant.  After one year to their current location at 2401 St. Ann Street in the 6th Ward.  They sustained significant damage during Hurricane Katrina but were able to reopen in 2007.  Today it is run by Willie Mae's granddaughter Kerry Seaton Stewart.

In 2014, Seaton-Stewart opened a second location in the Uptown neighborhood.

Ownership 
The restaurant was originally owned by Willie Mae Seaton, who was born in 1916 in Crystal Springs, Mississippi. After Seaton died in 2015 the restaurant was taken over by her great-granddaughter Kerry Seaton Stewart.

Awards and honors
 2005, James Beard Award for "America's Classic Restaurant for the Southern Region",
 2008, first season of Food Paradise
 2012, featured on Bizarre Foods America
 The Food Network and the Travel Channel named them "America's Best Fried Chicken"

References

Restaurants in New Orleans
Restaurants established in 1957
James Beard Foundation Award winners
1957 establishments in Louisiana